Algorithmic Puzzles is a book of puzzles based on computational thinking. It was written by computer scientists Anany and Maria Levitin, and published in 2011 by Oxford University Press.

Topics
The book begins with a "tutorial" introducing classical algorithm design techniques including backtracking, divide-and-conquer algorithms, and dynamic programming, methods for the analysis of algorithms, and their application in example puzzles. The puzzles themselves are grouped into three sets of 50 puzzles, in increasing order of difficulty. A final two chapters provide brief hints and more detailed solutions to the puzzles, with the solutions forming the majority of pages of the book.

Some of the puzzles are well known classics, some are variations of known puzzles making them more algorithmic, and some are new. They include:
Puzzles involving chessboards, including the eight queens puzzle, knight's tours, and the mutilated chessboard problem
Balance puzzles
River crossing puzzles
The Tower of Hanoi
Finding the missing element in a data stream
The geometric median problem for Manhattan distance

Audience and reception
The puzzles in the book cover a wide range of difficulty, and in general do not require more than a high school level of mathematical background.
William Gasarch notes that grouping the puzzles only by their difficulty and not by their themes is actually an advantage, as it provides readers with fewer clues about their solutions.

Reviewer Narayanan Narayanan recommends the book to any puzzle aficionado, or to anyone who wants to develop their powers of algorithmic thinking. Reviewer Martin Griffiths suggests another group of readers, schoolteachers and university instructors in search of examples to illustrate the power of algorithmic thinking.
Gasarch recommends the book to any computer scientist, evaluating it as "a delight".

References

Algorithms
Puzzle books
2011 non-fiction books
Oxford University Press books